Henri-Alexandre Junod (17 June 1863 Saint-Martin, Val-de-Ruz – 22 April 1934 Geneva) was a Swiss-born South African missionary, ethnographer, anthropologist, linguist and naturalist, stationed for much of his career at Shiluvane Mission Station outside Tzaneen in Limpopo Province. He received an early training in Protestant ministry at Neuchâtel, Basel and Berlin. He was one of the founding members of the Lemana Training College at  village near the Township of Waterval at Elim in 1906. Together with Reverend Creux of Valdezia Mission Station, he codified the language of the Tsonga people, which they called 'Thonga', but later renamed Xitsonga. Together with a group of Swiss Missionaries, such as Georges Liengme, he helped in the establishment of Elim Hospital in 1899.

He came from a family of clergy and missionaries and in 1885 received holy orders as a Protestant minister in the Independent Church of Neuchâtel. In 1887, after being accepted by the Mission Suisse Romande, he was sent to Edinburgh to study English and medicine.

Junod sailed for Mozambique in 1889 and was stationed at Rikatla Mission, some 30 km north of Lourenço Marques. In 1894 he was working from Lourenço Marques. Some of his early collections were from Pinetown and Howick. He soon published a Ronga grammar, which was followed by essays on the lifestyle and language of the Ronga. In 1896 he returned to Switzerland and stayed until 1899 when he founded an evangelical school at Shiluvane, returning once again in 1906 to Switzerland. During his term at Shiluvane he escaped from the Lowveld heat and fevers by living in a hut on a nearby mountain called Mamotseeri or Mamotsuiri. In 1917 he founded another evangelical school at Rikatla. Junod returned to Switzerland in 1921 but maintained his work and interest in African ethnography. His ashes were interred at Rikatla.

'The Life of a South African Tribe', which is about the life of Tsonga people, was published in two volumes in 1912, an enlarged version being printed in 1926 and 1962. The work has been translated into several languages and is highly regarded.

Henri Junod was an exceptional scholar, a member of many societies and with wide interests in the world of natural history, amassing extensive collections of beetles and butterflies.  His ethnographer son, Henri-Philippe Junod (1897–1987), wrote a biography 'Henri-A. Junod, Missionaire et Savant, 1863–1934'.

References
 Marcos Vinícius Santos Coelho, "A religião e as possibilidades para uma abordagem histórica sobre a visão de natureza entre os tsonga através do discurso de Henri Junod", Métis: história & cultura,  v. 10, n. 19, 2011
 Patrick Harries, Butterflies and Barbarians: Swiss Missionaries and Systems of Knowledge in South-East Africa, Oxford: James Currey, 2007
 Patrick Harries, "Through the eyes of the beholder: HA Junod and the notion of primitive",  Social Dynamics: A journal of African studies, Vol. 19, No.1, 1993 
 Patrick Harries, "The anthropologist as historian and liberal: H‐A. Junod and the Thonga", Journal of Southern African Studies, Vol.8, No.1, 1981 
 Lorenzo Macagno, "Missionaries and the Ethnographic Imagination. Reflections on the Legacy of Henri-Alexandre Junod (1863–1934)", Social Sciences and Missions (Leiden: Brill), Volume 22, Number 1, 2009

External links
Mountain Club of South Africa article

FOOTNOTES

South African entomologists
South African anthropologists
South African Protestant missionaries
South African naturalists
Linguists from South Africa
1863 births
1934 deaths
Protestant missionaries in South Africa
Swiss emigrants to South Africa
Swiss Protestant missionaries
Missionary linguists